Melodeon Records is a record label set up in 1964 by Richard K. Spottswood.

Melodeon Records issued - among others - the first recordings after his 'rediscovery' of Skip James and the 1940 Library Of Congress Sessions of Blind Willie McTell. In 1970 the label was acquired by Arnold S. Caplin's Biograph Records.

See also 
 List of record labels

External links
 Illustrated Melodeon Records discography

Defunct record labels of the United States
Blues record labels